The 1995 FIA 2-Litre World Rally Cup was the third season of the FIA 2-Litre World Rally Cup, an auto racing championship recognized by the Fédération Internationale de l'Automobile, running in support of the World Rally Championship.

Škoda was the defending champion.

Season summary

FIA 2-Litre World Rally Cup

External links 

 1994 FIA 2-Litre World Rally Cup at [http://www.ewrc-results.com ewrc-results.com]

World Rally Championship
FIA 2-Litre World Rally Cup